"Shadows" is a song by American alternative rock band Warpaint, written collectively by band members Theresa Wayman, Emily Kokal, Jenny Lee Lindberg and Stella Mozgawa. The song was released as the band's second single, and second and final single from the band's debut studio album The Fool, on January 10, 2011 on Rough Trade Records.

Track listing
Digital download
"Shadows" (Neon Lights remix) – 3:15

12" vinyl
"Shadows" – 4:04
"Undertow" (Javelin remix)

Personnel
Warpaint
Emily Kokal – guitar
Jenny Lee Lindberg – bass guitar, backing vocals
Stella Mozgawa – drums, keyboards
Theresa Wayman – vocals, guitar

Technical personnel
Tom Biller – producer, recording, mixing
Sonny DiPerri – assistant engineer
Nina Walsh – engineer

References

2011 songs
2011 singles
Rough Trade Records singles
Songs written by Emily Kokal
Warpaint (band) songs
Songs written by Jenny Lee Lindberg
Songs written by Theresa Wayman
Songs written by Stella Mozgawa